Harvey Lennox Watkins (June 14, 1869 – April 29, 1949) was a manager in Major League Baseball. In the  season, with the New York Giants he was the club's manager. During his lone season as manager, he led the Giants to 18 wins, with 17 losses in 35 games.

He was born in Seneca Falls, New York and died in Harrow, England in 1949. Watkins married an English woman and they eventually moved to England. Watkins and his wife both died when their furnace malfunctioned.

See also
San Francisco Giants general managers and managers

External links
Baseball-Reference manager page

1869 births
1949 deaths
New York Giants (NL) managers
People from Seneca Falls, New York
American emigrants to England
Accidental deaths in London